A List of Czech films of the 2010s.

References

2010s
Lists of 2010s films
Films